Born in Flames is a 1983 American dystopian docufiction drama film written, directed, produced and edited by  Lizzie Borden that explores racism, classism, sexism and heterosexism in an alternate socialist democratic United States. The title comes from the song "Born in Flames" written by a member of Art & Language, Mayo Thompson of the band Red Krayola.

Plot

The plot concerns two feminist groups in New York City, each voicing their concerns to the public by pirate radio. One group, led by an outspoken white lesbian, Isabel, operates Radio Ragazza. The other group, led by a soft-spoken African-American, Honey, operates Phoenix Radio. The local community is stimulated into action after a world-traveling political activist, Adelaide Norris, is arrested upon arriving at a New York City airport, and suspiciously dies while in police custody. Also, there is a Women's Army led by Hilary Hurst and advised by Zella that initially both Honey and Isabel refuse to join. This group, along with Norris and the radio stations, are under investigation by a callous FBI agent. Their progress is tracked by three editors for a socialist newspaper, who go so far that they get fired.

The story involves several different women coming from different perspectives and attempts to show several examples of how sexism plays out on the street and how it can be dealt with through direct action. At one point, two men attack a woman on the street, and dozens of women on bicycles with whistles come to chase the men away and comfort the woman. The movie shows women, despite their various differences, organizing in meetings, doing radio shows, creating art, wheatpasting, putting a condom on a penis, wrapping raw chicken at a processing plant, etc. The film portrays a world rife with violence against women, high female unemployment, and government oppression. The women in the film start to come together to make a bigger impact, by means that some would call terrorism.

Ultimately, after both radio stations are suspiciously burned down, Honey and Isabel team up and broadcast Phoenix Ragazza Radio from stolen U-Haul vans. They also join the Women's Army, which sends a group of terrorists to interrupt a broadcast of the president of the United States proposing that women be paid to do housework, followed by bombing the antenna on top of the World Trade Center to prevent additionally destructive messages from the mainstream.

Cast
 Honey as Honey, host of the Phoenix Radio
 Adele Bertei as Isabel, host of the Radio Ragazza
 Jean Satterfield as Adelaide Norris
 Florynce Kennedy (credited as "Flo Kennedy") as Zella Wylie 
 Becky Johnston as Becky Dunlop, newspaper editor
 Pat Murphy as Pat Crosby, newspaper editor
 Kathryn Bigelow as Kathy Larson, newspaper editor
 Hillary Hurst as the leader of Women's Army
 Sheila McLaughlin as other leader
 Marty Pottenger as other leader/woman at site
 Bell Chevigny as Belle Gayle, the talk show host
 Joel Kovel as the talk show guest
 Ron Vawter as FBI Agent
 John Coplans as chief
 John Rudolph as TV newscaster
 Warner Schreiner as TV newscaster
 Valerie Smaldone as TV newscaster
 Hal Miller as detective
 Bill Tatum as Mayor Zubrinsky
 Mark Boone Jr. as man in subway harassing woman

This film marks the first screen appearance of Eric Bogosian. He plays a technician at a TV station who is forced at gunpoint to run a videotape on the network feed. The movie also features a rare acting appearance by Academy Award-winning film director Kathryn Bigelow. Story contributor Ed Bowes portrays the head of the socialist newspaper that ultimately fires the female journalists.

Awards
In 1983, the film won the Reader Jury prize at the Berlin International Film Festival and the Grand Prix at the Créteil International Women's Film Festival.

Reception
Rotten Tomatoes reports an 87% approval rating based on 30 reviews, with an average rating of 7/10.

Variety wrote that it has "all the advantages and the disadvantages of a home movie". Janet Maslin of The New York Times wrote "Only those who already share Miss Borden's ideas are apt to find her film persuasive."  Marjorie Baumgarten of The Austin Chronicle wrote "Beautifully made, courageously edited, and swift-moving, this challenging, provocative film is a work that is both humanist and revolutionary." Frances Dickinson of Time Out London wrote that Borden "[handles] her story with audacity and make[s] even the driest argument crackle with humour, while the more poignant moments burn with a fierce white heat." TV Guide rated it 2/4 stars and wrote "This feminist film wins laurels for close attention to detail in a radical filmmaking effort." Greg Baise of the Metro Times called it "an early '80s landmark of indie and queer cinema". In 2022, the film was ranked joint 243rd in Sight & Sound's Greatest Films of All Time poll, tied for the distinction along with 21 other films, including A Clockwork Orange, Annie Hall, and Possession.

References 
 The movie refers to many feminist movements and tools, including black feminism, white feminism, consciousness raising, independent radio, and police brutality.
 There is also a reference to wages for housework, a feminist social movement from the seventies addressing women's reproductive labor, in a scene in which the president announces on TV that “For the first time in our history we’ll provide women with wages for housework”, just before a group of women hijack the broadcast to pass a militant message. This moment in the film highlights political antagonisms, between white hetero-normative feminism and anti-racist and anti-capitalist feminism.
 The movie refers to US policies like the workfare programme and the Full Employment and Balanced Growth Act of 1976, which discriminate single and queer women (news scene where the journalist announces that ‘male heads of families’ would get jobs).
 Media historian Lucas Hilderbrand made a parallel with A Black Feminist Statement, from the Combahee River Collective (1977), a Black feminist lesbian organization.
 The film includes the Red Krayola song "Born In Flames", released as a single in 1980, as well as the songs "I’ll Take You There" by the African-American gospel, R&B, and soul group The Staple Singers, "Strange Fruit" by Billie Holiday, "Voodoo Child" by Jimi Hendrix and "New Town" by the British female punk rock group The Slits.
 The casting of the movie stages civil rights lawyer and activist Florynce Kennedy, Adele Bertei from the bands The Bloods and The Contortions, film director Kathryn Bigelow, and actors Ron Vawter and Eric Bogosian.

Influence
The film is discussed in Christina Lane's book Feminist Hollywood: From "Born in Flames" to "Point Break".

A “graphic translation” of the movie made by artist Kaisa Lassinaro, which contains an interview of Lizzie Borden, was published by Occasional Papers in 2011. The book is a collage composition made of screencaps with a selection of dialogues from the movie.

In 2013, a dossier on the film was published as a special issue of Women & Performance: A Journal of Feminist Theory. With an introduction from Craig Willse and Dean Spade, the dossier includes a number of essays that address race, queerness, intersectionality, radicalism, violence, and feminism in the film.

The film has experienced something of a renaissance after the 35mm restoration print premiered in 2016 at the Anthology Film Archives. Richard Brody of The New Yorker wrote "the free, ardent, spontaneous creativity of Born in Flames emerges as an indispensable mode of radical change—one that many contemporary filmmakers with political intentions have yet to assimilate." He also wrote "Borden's exhilarating collage-like story stages news reports, documentary sequences, and surveillance footage alongside tough action scenes and musical numbers; her violent vision is both ideologically complex and chilling." Melissa Anderson of The Village Voice wrote "this unruly, unclassifiable film — perhaps the sole entry in the hybrid genre of radical-lesbian-feminist sci-fi vérité — premiered two years into the Reagan regime, but its fury proves as bracing today as it was back when this country began its inexorable shift to the right." Borden was invited to show the new 35mm print in Brussels, Barcelona, Madrid, San Sebastián, Milan, Toronto, the Edinburgh Film Festival, London Film Festival, along with screenings in Detroit, Rochester, San Francisco, and Los Angeles.

See also
 Afrofuturism in film

References

External links
 
 
 
 
 Interview of Lizzie Borden by Fiona Duncan at Vice
 "The 34 best political movies ever made" by Ann Hornaday at The Washington Post (Jan. 23, 2020), ranked #25
 Heresies journal #16 (1983) features a detailed synopsis of the plot with extensive quotations

1983 films
1980s science fiction drama films
Films about pirate radio
Afrofuturist films
American feminist films
1983 independent films
1983 LGBT-related films
American LGBT-related films
American mockumentary films
American science fiction drama films
American dystopian films
1980s feminist films
Films about anarchism
Films about race and ethnicity
LGBT-related political films
LGBT-related science fiction films
Films directed by Lizzie Borden (director)
LGBT socialism
Lesbian feminist mass media
Lesbian-related films
1980s satirical films
1983 drama films
1980s dystopian films
1980s English-language films
1980s American films